Filippo Nigro (born 3 December 1970) is an Italian actor.

Life and career 
Born in Rome, Nigro studied at the Centro Sperimentale di Cinematografia under Lina Wertmüller.  
After a minor role in the 2001 Ferzan Ozpetek's drama film The Ignorant Fairies and several television works, in 2003 Nigro had his breakout role as Filippo, the Giovanna Mezzogiorno's husband in Ozpetek's Facing Windows. In 2004 he was appointed Shooting Star at the Berlin International Film Festival. In 2009 he was nominated at David di Donatello for Best Supporting Actor for his performance in Different from Whom?.

Nigro is married to film and television producer Gina Gardini. They have three children.

Selected filmography 
 The Ignorant Fairies (2001) 
 Facing Windows (2003) 
 Different from Whom? (2008) 
 A Game for Girls (2008)  
 Love, Soccer and Other Catastrophes (2008)  
 Amore che vieni, amore che vai (2008)  
 Different from Whom? (2009)  
 Oggi sposi (2009)   
 From the Waist Up (2010) 
 They Call It Summer (2012) 
 ACAB – All Cops Are Bastards (2012) 
 Barabbas (2012) 
 Deep in the Wood (2015)
 Suburra: Blood on Rome (2017-2020)
 The Goddess of Fortune (2019)
 The Book of Vision (2020)

References

External links 
Sito ufficiale, su filipponigro.it.

1970 births
Male actors from Rome
Italian male stage actors
Italian male film actors
Italian male television actors
Living people
Centro Sperimentale di Cinematografia alumni